SS Halton R. Carey was a Liberty ship built in the United States during World War II.

Construction
Halton R. Carey was laid down on 21 December 1944, under a Maritime Commission (MARCOM) contract, MC hull 2398, by J.A. Jones Construction, Brunswick, Georgia; she was sponsored by Mrs. A.W. Henson, and launched on 25 January 1945.

History
She was allocated to American Liberty Line, on 7 February 1945. On 17 May 1948, she was laid up in the National Defense Reserve Fleet, in Wilmington, North Carolia. On 28 May 1963, she was sold to Northern Metals Co., for scrapping.

References

Bibliography

 
 
 
 
 

 

Liberty ships
Ships built in Brunswick, Georgia
1945 ships
Wilmington Reserve Fleet